Leon Lewis may refer to:

 Leon Lewis (American writer, 1833–1920)
 Leon L. Lewis (American attorney, 1888–1954)
 Leon "Bud" Lewis (American soccer player, born 1953)